C. David Cush (born Shreveport, Louisiana) is the CEO of Service King, an auto repair company.

Cush was the CEO of Virgin America from December 2007 to December 2016. He was named CEO on November 26, 2007, effective December 10, 2007, replacing Fred Reid.

Prior to joining Virgin America, Cush held a number of positions at American Airlines in his 20 years with the airline, including Vice President of International Planning and Alliances and Chief of Sales.  He also oversaw the re-organization of American Airlines' St. Louis hub at Lambert Field following American's acquisition of TWA,  Cush earned his MBA from the Cox School of Business, Southern Methodist University.

References

External links
Bio at Virgin America

Year of birth missing (living people)
Living people
People from Shreveport, Louisiana
Southern Methodist University alumni
American airline chief executives